The Tomini–Tolitoli languages are a disputed subgroup in the Austronesian language family spoken off the Gulf of Tomini and the district of Tolitoli in northern Central Sulawesi province, Indonesia, consisting of two branches, viz. "Tomini" and "Tolitoli". The unity of this group has not yet been demonstrated, and it may well be that the two branches actually are not closer to each other than to other languages of Sulawesi.

Languages
The following tentative classification of the Tomini–Tolitoli languages is from Himmelmann (2001:20).

Tolitoli
Totoli
Boano
Tomini
Northern Tomini
Ampibabo
Lauje
Tialo (Tomini)
Dondo
Southern Tomini
Balaesang
Pendau
Dampelas
Taje (Petapa)
Tajio

Totoli and Boano are closely related to each other but diverge very much from the other languages in terms of lexicon, phonology, and other areas. These two languages may have been influenced by the Gorontalic languages and also more recently by South Sulawesi languages such as Bugis and Makassar (Himmelmann 2001:20). Mead (2003) notes that certain aspects of the phonological history of Totoli and Boano even point against an inclusion of these two languages in the Celebic subgroup.

Demographics
The demographics below are from Himmelmann (2001:18).

West Coast
Balaesang: 3,200
Pendau (Ndau): 3,200
Dampelas (Dampal): 10,300
Dondo: 13,000
Totoli (Tolitoli): 25,000

East Coast
Taje (Petapa): 350
Ampibabo-Lauje: 6,000
Tajio (Kasimbar): 12,000
Lauje (Tinombo): 38,000
Tialo (Tomini): 30,000
Boano (Bolano): 2,700

Total 145,000

Footnotes

References
Himmelmann, Nikolaus P. 2001. Sourcebook on Tomini-Tolitoli languages: General information and word lists. Canberra: Pacific Linguistics, The Australian National University.

External links
"Tomini-Tolitoli" at Ethnologue (23rd ed, 2020).

 
Celebic languages